France–Singapore relations refers to the bilateral relations between the French Republic and the Republic of Singapore.

Bilateral relations
France and Singapore enjoy good bilateral relations, spreading across most fields, including political, education, economic, cultural and defence. France was one of the first 13 countries which recognised the independence of Singapore in 1965. Former Chief Minister of Singapore David Marshall became the first Singapore Ambassador to France.

Political relations
French-Singaporean relations are excellent and dense in numerous fields. They are first of all maintained by a political dialogue at the highest level. Recent years have been marked by the working visit made by French President Jacques Chirac to Singapore on 6 October 2004, prior to the ASEAN Summit in Hanoi and his official visit to China. On this visit, the French President met Singapore Prime Minister Lee Hsien Loong, Senior Minister Goh Chok Tong and Minister Mentor Lee Kuan Yew. Singapore Prime Minister Lee Hsien Loong, who visited France in January 2003 as Deputy Prime Minister, returned there on 28 and 29 November 2005 as Prime Minister and was received by both French President Chirac and Prime Minister Dominique de Villepin.

In March 2007, President of the French Senate, Christian Poncelet made an official visit to Singapore as the head of a delegation comprising three senators. They met with Singapore President S. R. Nathan, Prime Minister Lee Hsien Loong, and Parliament Speaker Abdullah Tarmugi. On 27 June 2007, while on a private visit in Paris, Singapore Minister Mentor Lee Kuan Yew met with newly elected French President Nicolas Sarkozy at the Elysee Palace, the first meeting between the both.

In 2008, bilateral political relations between the two countries entered a new phase with the official visit that Singapore Prime Minister Lee Hsien Loong made to France from 21 to 23 January 2008. It was Lee's second visit to France as Prime Minister and the first time that he met with French President Nicolas Sarkozy. The two leaders exchanged views on recent developments in France and Europe. They also had a wide-ranging discussions on bilateral relations, as well as regional and international developments.

Economic relations
Singapore is France's third-leading trading partner in Asia and the leading trading partner in the Southeast Asian region. In 2004, a pick-up in Singapore and regional demand led to increased exports, which further resulted in the renewed dynamism of our trade activities. French exports of agricultural and agri-food goods as well as consumer goods account for more than a quarter of our exports to Singapore. Aeronautics construction continues to drive export growth. Singapore is an important regional platform for French companies, in particular in the areas of electronics, finance and chemistry. With total investments standing at €3.5 billion, Singapore is the second destination of French investments in Asia, after Japan. The city-state plays host to 400 French company sites (mainly in the electronics and financial services industries) and about 40 companies that have been founded locally. In 2003, 25 of these companies were included among the 1,000 leading companies in Singapore. STMicroelectronics is Singapore's biggest private employer.

As of 2004, there are more than 400 French companies in Singapore.

Education
The National University of Singapore initiated an exchange programme for students to gain more knowledge of French culture and language. The National Centre of Science Research (CNRS) was involved in the setting up of a joint laboratory between Thales and Nanyang Technological University.

The Lycée Français de Singapour (LFS), a private school established in 1999 under Singapore law and recognised by the French Ministry of National Education, provides education to French nationals living in Singapore as well as to French speaking or English speaking expatriate children who wish to follow the French curriculum. It also welcomes Singaporean children as early as nursery school/kindergarten. The LFS now counts more than 1090 students who benefit from its very functional infrastructure and up-to-date equipment.

As Singapore is striving to become an educational and economic hub in South-east Asia and is viewed as a gateway into the region, the French Business School ESSEC established its Asian campus here, halfway between the two Asian giants India and China. The ESSEC Asian Centre Campus in Singapore was officially opened on 13 May 2006.

The Alliance Française is the leading French language school in Singapore. It also houses a French cultural centre with a well-equipped library with French books.

Defence
Defence cooperation holds a key position in the bilateral relations between France and Singapore, and these ties are old and strong. They feature three components, a military cooperation, overseen by an agreement signed in Paris in October 1998, which in particular has allowed for a squadron from the Republic of Singapore Air Force to be stationed in France since 1999; an annual strategic dialogue, started in 1999 and led by the ministries of defence, with one session each year involving the army, navy and air force groups; a partnership for the acquisition of weapons. France is the second-leading supplier of weapons to Singapore, which acquired six stealth frigates in 2000, and its third partner in research and development in defence technology. Exchanges of visits by high-level military leaders between the two countries have been taking place frequently since 1997.

In the field of armament, the cooperation is based on an active and permanent dialogue on researches and studies. Through the Delta programme, the Republic of Singapore Navy has acquired six stealth frigates the first of which was built in France and commissioned on 5 May 2007 while the 5 others are being built at the Singaporean shipyard STM. The Delta programme is a key element in the Franco-Singapore defence cooperation because it involves the transfer of know-how and of technology that gives Singapore a role of partner and not simply that of a client.

French Chamber of Commerce
Established in 1979, and belonging to a worldwide network of 114 French Chambers (UCCIFE) in 78 countries with over 25,000 companies, the French Chamber of Commerce in Singapore (FCCS) is one of the leading chambers in South East Asia. The FCCS' mission is to develop relations between FCCS members and the Singaporean business community, and to encourage economic, commercial and investment relations between France and Singapore.

Resident diplomatic missions
 France has an embassy in Singapore.
 Singapore has an embassy in Paris.

See also
 Foreign relations of France 
 Foreign relations of Singapore
 French School of Singapore

References

 
Singapore
Bilateral relations of Singapore